Loyola College is a private Catholic higher education institution run by the Society of Jesus in Chennai, Tamil Nadu, India. It was founded in 1925 by the French Jesuit priest, Francis Bertram, along with other European Jesuits. It is an autonomous Jesuit college affiliated with the University of Madras. Loyola commerce association celebrated its 75th year in 2019. Loyola College has more than 8000 students studying as of 2021.

Rankings

Loyola College secured 4th rank among 100 colleges in The National Institutional Ranking Framework (NIRF) ranking 2022 with a score of 71.00. It admits undergraduates and post-graduates and confers degrees in the commerce, sciences and liberal arts. The college is on a  campus in the neighbourhood of Nungambakkam. The campus features tree-lined pathways, academic buildings, steepled Gothic church that dates back to 1930, and separate fields for each sport.

History

The name Loyola comes from the ancestral castle where Íñigo López de Loyola was born in 1491, the last of a large Basque family. He along with St. Francis Xavier and five other companions founded the Society of Jesus (the Jesuit Order), a worldwide organization of religious men numbering about 19,000. Nearly 4,000 are working in the 18 provinces of India.

In Tamil Nadu there are 480 Jesuits working in schools, colleges, youth services, social work centres, parishes, mission outreach programmes, and in other forms of service and church ministry.

Loyola College was founded in 1925 by the French Jesuit priest, Francis Bertram (originally a.k.a. Père François Bertrand; 1870/1871–1936), along with other European Jesuits, Fr Francis Bertram was educated at the universities of Oxford, Cambridge, and the London School of Economics. The Department of Economics was founded by Basenach from the London School of Economics.

Academics

The college offers courses at the undergraduate and postgraduate levels. The arts/humanities stream includes English, economics, commerce, history, Tamil and sociology. Science courses include physics, chemistry, statistics, botany, zoology and computer science. The college follows a credit-based, semester pattern. Undergraduate students must pass all examinations and obtain at least 120 credits in three years to be eligible for a degree. All students must also earn non-academic credits from extra-curricular and social service options. The Department of Outreach facilitates social work in the college. It is a degree requirement that every student irrespective of department complete the outreach program in second year, intended to form more complete human persons. The program takes students to slums and backward areas in and around Chennai to acquaint them with the sufferings of the people and to serve in small ways to better the living conditions. The program awards 3 credits.

Loyola College along with Women's Christian college are the only colleges in the state capital Chennai with "A+" accreditation from NAAC. India Today magazine in 2005, 2006, 2007, 2008, and 2009 ranked Loyola number one in India for science degrees, and in 2007 in both science and humanities. The Department of Scientific and Industrial Research has recognised Loyola College as a Scientific and Industrial Research Organisation, the highest research honour for an Arts and Science College.

The college has been conferred a "College with Potential For Excellence" status by the University Grants Commission. It was given a 10 million grant (1 Crore) in 2006 by the UGC for continual improvement of facilities. The UGC has further certified it as a "College of Excellence" in the year 2014. The certification, for a period of five years until 2019, comes with a grant of Rs. 2 crore for the college to upgrade its facilities.

Loyola college is one of the colleges which was selected for Deen Dayal Upadhyay KAUSHAL Kendra, a remarkable scheme initiated and funded by the Government of India and the University Grants Commission. It hosts a variety of courses like B.Voc. 3D Animation, B.Voc. Digital Journalism, M.Voc. 3D Animation and M.Voc. Digital Journalism, all of which are designed to offer Job oriented training. It has both UG and PG level curriculum courses in the department.

Faculty 

T. N. Ananthakrishnan, joined the Department of Natural Sciences, Loyola College in 1948, build the Department of Zoology from scratch, established Entomology Research Unit within the Loyola College campus in 1968. He became the Director of Zoological Survey of India (ZSI), Calcutta in 1977. He won several laurels: 500 journal papers, 33 reference volumes and monographs, Rafi Ahmad Kidwai Award, Jawaharlal Nehru Fellowship, INSA Senior Scientist Award, Pitambar Pant Environmental Fellowship, and the Asiatic Society Gold Medal. He is a Fellow of both the National Science Academies at Bangalore (IAS) and New Delhi (INSA), and the National Academy of Agricultural Sciences.  Many insect species are named after him (Ananthakrishnana Bhatti 1967, Ananthakrishnaniella Stannard 1970, Ananthakrishnanothrips Bournier 1985; Allelothrips ananthakrishnani Stannard 1961, Hydatothrips ananthakrishnani Bhatti 1973, Exothrips ananthakrishnani Bhatti 1975, Helionothrips ananthakrishnani Wilson 1975, Liothrips ananthakrishnani Sen 1976, Terthrothrips ananthakrishnani Kudô 1978, Plectrothrips ananthakrishnani Okajima 1981 and Hennigithrips ananthakrishnani Johansen 1986).
A. W. Rabi Bernard, member of the Parliament of India
 Father. Jerome D'Souza, S.J., Rector and Principal of Loyola College, Chennai from 1942 to 1950, elected to represent Madras legislative assembly at the Constituent Assembly of India from 1946 to 1950, member of the Indian Delegation to the United Nations General Assembly (1949, 1951–1952, 1955, 1957), founder-director of the Indian Social Institute from 1951 to 1956, appointed as the Assistant and adviser of the Superior General of the Jesuits (Jean-Baptiste Janssens) for Indian and Asian affairs in 1957.
G. Prabha, journalist, Professor of Sanskrit, and director of  'Ishti', the first film in Sanskrit with a social theme
P. R. Pisharoty, physicist and meteorologist, father of remote sensing in India, began his career as a lecturer in Loyola College, Chennai in 1935, joined the India Meteorological Department in 1942, founder Director of the Indian Institute of Tropical Meteorology, Pune in 1962, Director of Remote Sensing and Satellite Meteorology, ISRO Space Applications Centre, Ahmedabad during 1972–75, Member of the Scientific Advisory Board of World Meteorological Organization from 1963 to 1968 and later its Chairman, Emeritus Professor at Physical Research Laboratory, recipient of Raman Centenary Medal (1988), INSA's Prof K R Ramanathan Medal (1990), International Meteorological Organization Prize in 1989

Institute for Excellence

 Loyola College of Education 
 Loyola Institute of Business Administration
 Centre for International Program
 Entomology Research Institute
 Ignatian Institute for Career Development
 Institute for Dialogues with Cultures and Religions (Research institution under University of Madras)
 Loyola – Racine Research Institute of Mathematics and Computer Sciences

 Loyola ICAM College of Engineering and Technology
 Loyola Institute for Industrial and Social Science Research
 Loyola Institute of Frontier Energy
 Loyola Institute of People Studies
 Loyola Institute of Social Science Training and Research
 Loyola Institute of Personal Development
 Loyola Institute of Vocational Education

Culturals
Loyola College was a pioneer among colleges in South India in hosting cultural fests, and stands out among men's college in Chennai for fostering well-rounded development. Women were first admitted at the turn of the millennium, and they too are encouraged to participate in cultural activities. The college has been commended for its blend of cultures and for requiring all students to have weekly contact with the poor. Its cultural sensitivity also extends worldwide.

The large, Down Sterling inter-college carnival was terminated by college authorities in 1992 when things got out of hand. This historic carnival is memorialized in the friendship song "MUSTHAFA MUSTHAFA" from the movie Kadhal Desam (1996).

To somewhat fill the void the Loyola Student's Union organizes the intra-collegiate cultural event Ovations each September where the students compete for the Trophy in both on and off stage cultural competitions while representing their home departments. The college also used to host an annual inter-collegiate dance competition called "Ignite" each February, where its dance team, Loyola Dream Team, excels; also featured are Western/acoustic music bands, and variety and mime teams, but hasn't been conducted for the past 3 years for various reasons.

Alumni 
Loyola college alumni also referred to as Loyolites have been contributors in various fields of law, politics, civil services, science, education, business, sports and entertainment.

Law and politics

Heads of state and Heads of government 
 
 
Daniel Lisulo, third Prime minister of Zambia
 Ramaswamy Venkataraman, Eighth President of India, Indian independence activist, and member of the Constituent Assembly of India

Supreme Court Judges 
 
 
 Jasti Chelameswar, former judge of the Supreme Court of India
 K. M. Joseph, sitting judge of the Supreme Court of India
 M. M. Sundresh, sitting judge of the Supreme Court of India

High Court Judges 
 
 
 Kumar Rajarathnam, Chief Justice of the Madhya Pradesh High Court
 R Sudhakar, Chief Justice of the Manipur High Court
 Sundaram Nainar Sundaram, Chief justice of Gujarat and Telangana High Court.

Governors 
 
 
 M. O. Hasan Farook Maricar, former Chief minister of Pondicherry, former Governor of Kerala
 M. K. Narayanan, former National Security Adviser of India, Director of Intelligence Bureau, the Governor of West Bengal and he also played a significant role in the negotiation of the India–United States Civil Nuclear Agreement

Other political figures 
 
 
 P. Chidambaram, Member of Parliament, former Finance Minister, Government of India
 B. S. Gnanadesikan, president of the Tamil Nadu Congress Committee [TNCC]
 A. P. Shanmugasundara Goundar, former Member of the Legislative Assembly, Tamil Nadu
 P. J. Joseph, Member of Legislative Assembly, Minister, Government of Kerala
 Jose K. Mani, Member of Parliament, chairman of Kerala Congress (M) party
 Dayanidhi Maran, Member of Parliament, former Minister of Communications and Information Technology, Government of India
 J. Shivashanmugam Pillai, first speaker of Madras Legislative Assembly (1946 -1955), first Scheduled Caste mayor of Madras
 V. Vaithilingam, former Chief minister of Pondicherry
K. Thulasiah Vandayar, former Member of Parliament, Secretary and Correspondent of the A.V.V.M Sri Pushpam College
 P. Wilson, Member of Parliament and former Additional Solicitor General of India

Civil servants 
 
 
F. V. Arul, IPS, second Director of Central Bureau of Investigation (CBI)
K. Sankaran Nair, Imperial Police, former Director of the Research and Analysis Wing (R&AW)
Ronald Carlton Vivian Piadade Noronha, Indian Civil Service, second and fifth Chief Secretary of Madhya Pradesh state (1963–68, 1972–74), RCVP Noronha Academy of Administration & Management (RCVP), premier training institution of M.P. Government is named after him
B. Raman, IPS, former head of the counter-terrorism division of the Research and Analysis Wing (R&AW)
Pattabhi Sundar Raman, former advocate-general of Tamil Nadu
 C. Rangarajan, 19th Governor of the Reserve Bank of India and Chairman of the Prime Minister's Economic Advisory Council
V. K. Rao, Indian Civil Service, Principal Secretary to the President of India, Neelam Sanjiva Reddy
V. Selvaraj, IAS, Chairman of Madras Port Trust and Industries Secretary of the Government of Tamil Nadu 
C. G. Somiah, IAS, former Comptroller and Auditor General of India
S. Sripal, IPS, former Director General of Police, Tamil Nadu State
N. Vittal, IAS, former Central Vigilance Commissioner
Beno Zephine, first 100% visually challenged Indian Foreign Service Officer

Social workers 

 P. K. Gopal, International President of the International Association for Integration, Dignity and Economic Advancement of people affected by leprosy (IDEA), first Chairman of the National Forum of Persons affected by Leprosy (now Association of People affected by Leprosy), recipient of the Padma Shri award in 2012.
Joe Madiath, Social Entrepreneur, founder and chairman of Gram Vikas, a non-governmental organisation based in Orissa, recipient of Water Champion Award from Asian Development Bank and Social Life Time Achievement Award by Godfrey Phillips National Bravery Awards in 2006

Science, technology, medicine, and mathematics 
 

Geetha Angara, first woman to be awarded a master's in chemistry by the university, receiving a gold medal in the process for graduating at the top of the class. Victim of an unsolved 2005 homicide in the U.S.
Narayanan Chandrakumar, Professor Emeritus at IIT Madras, founder of the first Nuclear magnetic resonance (NMR) laboratory in India, Shanti Swarup Bhatnagar laureate
Ranjan Roy Daniel, former Dean, School of Physics and Senior Professor at Tata Institute of Fundamental Research, Bombay, Scientific Secretary of the Committee on Science and Technology in Developing Countries (COSTED) from 1988 to 1995, Chairman of ISRO's National Committee on Middle Atmosphere Research (1989) and Advisory Committee on Space Sciences (1981–88), founder member of Indian Physics Association and Astronomical Society of India, founder Chairman of the  Bombay Association for Science Education, Fellow of IAS, INSA, TWAS, recipient of the Padma Bhushan award in 1992 and  COSPAR International Cooperation Medal in 1994
M. S. Narasimhan, Fellow of the Royal Society, London, Honorary Fellow of the Tata Institute of Fundamental Research, Head of the Mathematics group at the International Centre for Theoretical Physics, Trieste, derived Narasimhan–Seshadri theorem and recipient of the King Faisal International Prize for Science
Kadiyala Ramachandra, former head of the department of medicine at Madras Medical College and established the Department of Oncology & Cancer Chemotherapy and the Rheumatic Care Unit at the Government General Hospital, Chennai
Ramakrishna Ramaswamy, Visiting Professor at IIT Delhi, former president of the Indian Academy of Sciences, Bangalore, Vice President of the Indian National Science Academy, New Delhi and Vice Chancellor of the University of Hyderabad
C. P. Ramanujam, known for number theory and algebraic geometry (Ramanujam–Samuel theorem, Ramanujam vanishing theorem), a mathematics student of Father Charles Racine
Natesan Rangabashyam, established Ostomy Department in 1978 at Madras Medical College and Government General Hospital, Chennai, introduced the first M.Ch. (Surgical Gastroenterology) course in India in 1984, Honorary Surgeon to the President of India, R Venkataraman, Fellow of the Association of Surgeons of Great Britain and Ireland, National Academy of Medical Sciences, Academy of Medicine, Singapore and the recipient of Padma Bhushan in 2002 and Dr B C Roy National Award twice  
Paul Ratnasamy, catalyst scientist, former director of the CSIR-National Chemical Laboratory, Pune 
Ravi Sankaran, ornithologist, former Director of the Salim Ali Centre for Ornithology and Natural History
Lakshmanan Sathyavagiswaran, former Chief Medical Examiner-Coroner for the County of Los Angeles
C. S. Seshadri, Fellow of the Royal Society, London, founder and Director-Emeritus of the Chennai Mathematical Institute, derived Narasimhan–Seshadri theorem, the Seshadri constant is named after him, recipient of Padma Bhushan and Shanti Swarup Bhatnagar Prize for Science and Technology
Veeravalli S. Varadarajan, Professor Emeritus and Distinguished Research Professor at the Department of Mathematics, University of California, Los Angeles (UCLA), Trombi–Varadarajan theorem, a mathematics student of K.A. Adivarahan in 1950

Academics

Educational institution founders and presidents 
 
 
 Malcolm S Adiseshiah, Deputy Director-General of UNESCO (1963-1970), founder-director of the Madras Institute of Development Studies (MIDS), Vice Chancellor of the University of Madras (1975–78), recipient of the Padma Bhushan award in 2010
 Parvataneni Brahmayya, former president of the Institute of Chartered Accountants of India (ICAI)
 C. Raj Kumar, Founding Vice Chancellor of O. P. Jindal Global University and Founding Dean of Jindal Global Law School
 P. S. Manisundaram, first Principal of the Regional Engineering College (which later became the National Institute of Technology, Tiruchirappalli), the Alagappa Chettiar College of Engineering and Technology (ACGCET-Karaikudi) and the first Vice Chancellor of the Bharathidasan University, Tiruchirappalli 
 V. M. Muralidharan, Chairman, Ethiraj College for Women
K. Thulasiah Vandayar, Secretary and Correspondent of the A.V.V.M Sri Pushpam College and former Member of Parliament
 G. Viswanathan, founder and chancellor of Vellore Institute of Technology

Professors and scholars 
 
 
Srinivas Aravamudan, professor of English and former dean of the humanities at Duke University
Mrityunjay Athreya, former professor at the Indian Institute of Management, Calcutta, the London Business School and the Strathclyde Business School, Scotland
Aswath Damodaran, Professor of Finance at the Stern School of Business at New York University
C. K. Prahalad, Paul and Ruth McCracken Distinguished University Professor of Corporate Strategy at the Stephen M. Ross School of Business at the University of Michigan and distinguished fellow at the William Davidson Institute

Business 
 
 
Wenceslaus Anthony, Chairman & managing director of WAML Group, Act Industrial Pty Ltd, recipient of the title, Member of the New Zealand Order of Merit and the Pro Ecclesia et Pontifice
S. S. Badrinath, founder and chairman emeritus of Sankara Nethralaya, Chennai
M. Damodaran, IAS, Chairman of IndiGo, former Chairman of the Securities and Exchange Board of India (SEBI), the Industrial Development Bank of India (IDBI) and the Unit Trust of India (UTI)
R. K. Krishna Kumar, Tata Administrative Services (1963), Trustee of Sir Dorabji Tata Trust and Sir Ratan Tata Trust & Allied Trusts, former Vice Chairman of the Tata Global Beverages and Director of Tata Sons
Sashi Kumar, founder and promoter of Asianet, chairman of the Asian College of Journalism, Chennai
Verghese Kurien, Father of the White Revolution, Founder Chairman of the National Dairy Development Board (NDDB) from 1965 to 1998, the Gujarat Co-operative Milk Marketing Federation Ltd (GCMMF), from 1973 to 2006 and the Institute of Rural Management Anand from 1979 to 2006 
N. Mahalingam, former chairman, Sakthi Group and former chairman, Ethiraj College for Women
Arumugham Mahendran, Chairman and Managing Director of Global Consumer Products Private Limited and former Managing Director of Godrej Consumer Products Limited
Bala S. Manian, founder of ReaMetrix, Digital Optics and Quantum Dot Corporation
Kalanithi Maran, founder and chairman of the SUN Group
Sudhakar Ram, Group CEO and Managing Director of Mastek
Jerry Rao, chairman of the Value and Budget Housing Corporation and founder and former CEO of MphasiS Corporation.
W Hansraj Saxena, Chief Executive Officer News J, former chief operating officer of Sun Pictures
Ajit Shetty, former Chairman of Board of Directors, Janssen Pharmaceutica
Ram Shriram, Forbes billionaire, founding board member of Google Inc. (now Alphabet) and an initial investor in Google, Founder of the Sherpalo Ventures, Menlo Park and board member of the Stanford University.
A. Sivasailam, former chairman and managing director of Amalgamations Group of Industries
Damal Kandalai Srinivasan, co-founder of Hindu Mission Hospital, Chennai
N. Srinivasan, first Chairman of the International Cricket Council, managing director of India Cements Limited
Rangaswamy Srinivasan, inventor at IBM Research
Narayanan Vaghul, Chairman of the Board of ICICI Bank from 1985 to April 2009, director on the board of Wipro since 1997, member on the Boards of Mahindra World City Developers Limited, Piramal Enterprises Limited, Apollo Hospitals Enterprise Limited, recipient of the Padma Bhushan award in 2010

Sport 
 

 Viswanathan Anand, Five Teams World Chess Champion and winner of multiple International Chess tournaments
 Vijay Amritraj, tennis player
 Vasudevan Baskaran, captain of India men's national field hockey team, which won the gold medal at the 1980 Summer Olympics in Moscow, Soviet Union
 Mohammad Ghouse, cricket umpire and former Chairman of the Tamil Nadu Cricket Association
 Sunny Gupta, cricketer
 Jawad Hussain, first class cricket player (father of the former England captain, Nasir Hussain)
 Sharath Kamal, Indian table tennis player
 Ramanathan Krishnan, tennis player
 Ramesh Krishnan, tennis player
 Vidya Pillai, first Indian female snooker player to reach the finals of the WLBSA World Women's Snooker Championship
 Ramkumar Ramanathan, tennis player
 A. G. Kripal Singh, first class cricketer for Tamil Nadu
 A. G. Milkha Singh, cricketer
 Sivabalan, volleyball player
 Krishnamoorthy Vignesh, cricketer
 Sanjay Yadav, cricketer
 Tinu Yohannan, cricketer
 Edwin Sydney Vanspaul, footballer

Religion 
 

Archbishop Joseph Powathil, Archbishop emeritus of Archdiocese of Changanacherry.
Duraisamy Simon Cardinal Lourdusamy, Prefect Emeritus of the Congregation for the Oriental Churches
 Swami Parthasarathy, philosopher and exponent of Vedanta
Chidananda Saraswati, President of the Divine Life Society, Rishikesh, India

Journalism 
 

Kasturi Balaji, Managing Director of The Hindu
S. S. Balan, former chairman emeritus of the Vikatan Group
Vincent D'Souza, editor and publisher of The Mylapore Times and The Arcot Road Times
Manu Joseph, former editor of OPEN magazine, and a columnist for The International New York Times and The Hindustan Times
Narasimhan Murali, Co-Chairman, Kasturi & Sons Ltd., Proprietors of The Hindu Group of Publications
Sanjay Pinto, Indian lawyer, former bureau chief and resident editor, NDTV 24 X 7
N. Ram, Chairman, The Hindu Publishing Group (THG); former Editor-in-Chief, The Hindu Group of Publications
N. S. Ramaswami, Indian sports journalist and former assistant editor of The Hindu, Mail and Indian Express
Palagummi Sainath, former rural affairs editor of The Hindu, founder editor of the People's Archive of Rural India and recipient of the Ramon Magsaysay Award

Film, theatre, and television 
 
 

 I. Ahmed, film director and producer
 Ajesh, singer, music composer
 K. V. Anand, cinematographer and director
 Arulnithi, film actor 
 Mahesh Babu, Telugu film actor
 Ramachandra Babu, cinematographer
 Yuthan Balaji, film actor
 Gabriella Charlton, actor, dancer
 Joe D'Cruz, writer, novelist and documentary film director
 Venkatesh Daggubati, film actor
 Darshana, playback singer
 Kishen Das, actor
 Deepak Dinkar, film and television actor
 Gifton Elias, music composer
 R. Ajay Gnanamuthu film director
 Gokul, film director
 Vinay Govind, film director
 Sikkil Gurucharan, Carnatic musician – vocalist
 Kalidas Jayaram, actor and playback singer
 Anand Jeeva, cinematographer
 Ashwin Kakumanu, film actor
 Arvind Krishna, cinematographer, producer and actor
 Anand Krishnamoorthi, film sound designer, sound editor
 Krishna Kulasekaran, film actor
 Jagadeesh Kumar, singer
 Thiagarajan Kumararaja, film director
 Maalavika Manoj, singer
 Richard M. Nathan, cinematographer
 Shanmuga Pandian, film actor
 Suresh Peters, singer, music director, music producer
 Daniel Annie Pope, film actor
 Prashanth, film actor
 Pushkar–Gayathri, director duo
 Karthik Raja, music composer
 Yuvan Shankar Raja, music composer
 Mohan Rajan, lyricist
 K. Rajeshwar, film director
 P. C. Ramakrishna, theatre actor, The Madras Players
 Sunder Ramu, film and stage actor
 Paloma Rao, actress and performer 
 Jayam Ravi, film actor
 Anirudh Ravichander, music director
 Ruben, film editor
Shyam Sibi, Editor
 R. Sarathkumar, film actor
 I. V. Sasi, film director
 Vinayak Sasikumar, lyricist
 Ashok Selvan, film actor
 Silambarasan, film actor, singer, lyricst, film director, music composer
 Sibiraj, film actor
 Johnny Chakravarthy, film actor
 Tatineni Satya, film director
 Rajesh M. Selva, film director and screenwriter
 Soundararajan, cinematographer
 Bhuvan Srinivasan, film editor
 R. Sudharsan, film editor
 Suriya, film actor, producer, founder of the Agaram Foundation
 S. J. Surya, film actor, director, screenwriter, producer, music composer, singer
 Arvind Swami,  film actor
 Hiphop Tamizha, (Jeeva) Tamil Hip-hop pioneers
 Vijay Vasanth, actor and managing director of Vasanth & Co
 Arthi Venkatesh, actress
 Vetrimaaran, film director, producer and writer
 Vijay, film actor, also known as 'Thalapathy' by the media, a popular actor in Tamil cinema
 John Vijay, film actor
 Vikram, film actor
 Siddharth Vipin, music composer 
 Vishal, film actor, producer and anti-piracy activist
 Sam Vishal, singer
 Vishnuvardhan, film director
 Josh Vivian,  singer, music composer

Other 
 
 

S. Nandagopal, sculptor and painter and member of the Madras Art Movement
Sidney Sladen, fashion designer
Anukreethy Vas, Femina Miss India World 2018
Tenzin Tsundue, Tibetan writer and activist

Gallery

See also
 Loyola Institute Business Administration
 Loyola-ICAM College of Engineering and Technology
 Loyola College of Education
 List of Jesuit sites

References

External links

 

 St Xavier's College, Jaipur

 
Jesuit universities and colleges in India
Educational institutions established in 1925
Arts and Science colleges in Chennai
Colleges affiliated to University of Madras
1925 establishments in India